Wenceslaus of Krosno (1391 – before 4 February 1431), a Duke of Żagań-Głogów during 1397–1412 (as co-ruler of his brother), during 1412–17 ruler over Głogów (with his brothers as co-rulers), since 1417 ruler over Krosno Odrzańskie, Świebodzin and Bytnica.

He was the fourth and youngest son of Henry VIII the Sparrow, Duke of Głogów by his wife Katharina, daughter of Duke Władysław of Opole.

Life
After his father's early death in 1397, Wenceslaus and his older brothers succeeded him in his lands as co-rulers, but remained under the care of their mother and settled their residence in Kożuchów, which, together with Zielona Góra, was her dower. The official guardianship of the young princes and the regency of the Duchy were held by Duke Rupert I of Legnica until 1401, when Wenceslaus's older brother Jan I attained his majority and assumed the government of the Duchy and the custody of his younger brothers by himself.

In 1412, the formal division of their Duchy occurred: Jan I retained Żagań and Wenceslaus, together with his brother Henry IX the Older and Henry X Rumpold obtained Głogów as co-rulers. In 1417, another duchy was divided, this time the Duchy of Głogów. Henry IX the Older and Henry X Rumpold retained Głogów and Szprotawa, while Wenceslaus received the towns of Krosno Odrzańskie, Świebodzin and Bytnica.

Wenceslaus was a vassal of the Emperor Sigismund, taking part in his coronation as King of Bohemia in Prague on 28 July 1420, three years later in the congress of Pressburg (now Bratislava), and finally in the war against the Hussites.

Wenceslaus died around 1431, after accidentally shooting himself while handling a gun without precaution. He died unmarried and childless; for this, all his lands were inherited by his brother, Henry IX.

References

Chronological Dates in Stoyan
This article was translated from his original in Polish Wikipedia.

|-

1390s births
1431 deaths
Piast dynasty
Firearm accident victims
Accidental deaths in Poland
Deaths by firearm in Poland